The 2020 Sparta earthquake was a relatively uncommon intraplate earthquake that occurred near the small town of Sparta, North Carolina, on August 9, 2020 at 8:07 am local time. Shaking was reported throughout the Southern, Midwestern, and Northeastern United States. It was the strongest earthquake recorded in North Carolina in 104 years, the second-strongest in the state's history, and the largest to strike the East Coast since the 2011 Virginia earthquake.

Geology 

The earthquake occurred near the Piedmont region and Blue Ridge Mountains, part of the eastern Appalachian Mountain range which formed due to an ancient continental collision with the African Plate roughly 480 million years ago during the Ordovician period. Many thrust faults were formed during this time as the mountain grew in size. When Pangea broke up, the uplift of the Appalachians ultimately ceased, leading to increased erosion rates due to the steep terrain. Ever since, the mountains have been gradually diminishing in size to their current state today. The mountains also played a role in where the quake was felt, with "DYFI" reports sharply decreasing west of the Appalachians.

Erosion carries sediments out of the mountains and down towards the Atlantic Ocean (on the east side) and the Gulf of Mexico (on the west). This movement of sediment can alleviate the pressure of overlying rocks and cause ancient faults (once active during the mountain building processes) to reactivate and create earthquakes. It is believed this is a factor in the 2020 Sparta earthquake as well as others in the region such as the 2011 Virginia earthquake.

The area of the earthquake is located marginally within the Eastern Tennessee Seismic Zone. The ETSZ is responsible for a number of moderate-sized earthquakes in the past, with the last notable earthquake occurring in eastern Tennessee in 2018.

Earthquake 

The focal mechanism for the earthquake suggest oblique-reverse faulting on either a northwest, or south-striking fault. It produced "Very strong" shaking, and over 100,000 reported feeling it.

Foreshocks 

Aftershocks 
The strongest aftershock of the sequence was a  that struck 2 days after the mainshock. In total, there were 20 recorded aftershocks as of August 27, 2020.

Impacts

Damage 
Widespread damage occurred in Sparta, which had already been debilitated by the COVID-19 pandemic in North Carolina. Damages include collapsed ceilings, chimneys, and masonry; damaged water mains; cracked and deformed roads; uprooted headstones; and displaced appliances and items. Wes Brinegar, the town's mayor, issued a state of emergency to apply for FEMA and state financial aid. Damage was worse than initially thought, with at least 525 structures being damaged, and 60 with major damage, meaning at least 40% of the structure was a total loss. 19 people lost their homes, 25 were declared uninhabitable, and scammers took advantage of the damage, charging people up to $500 USD for repairs, but never showing up.

Governor of North Carolina, Roy Cooper, toured the damage in Sparta, releasing a statement later, stating "We’ve dealt with a hurricane, a violent tornado, and now an earthquake all in the middle of a pandemic: North Carolinians are resilient."

Injuries 
There were no fatalities. A seven-year-old boy in Sparta who was cut by a falling picture frame was the only reported injury.

See also 

 List of earthquakes in 2020
 List of earthquakes in the United States

References 

2020 earthquakes
2020 in North Carolina
2020 natural disasters in the United States
Alleghany County, North Carolina
August 2020 events in the United States
Earthquakes in North Carolina
Geology of North Carolina